The Lost Tomb is a 2015 Chinese streaming television series based on the internet novel Daomu Biji. The series was originally intended to have 8 seasons filmed over a period of 8 years but only three seasons were produced as of 2020. The first season premiered on iQiyi on 12 June 2015.

Synopsis
Wu Xie (Li Yifeng) is an antique shop owner who comes from a family of tomb raiders. As he continues the family trade with his team of tomb raiders, he finds lost treasures of the Warring States as well as the answers to the tragedies of his family's past. With the help of his grandfather's notes and his team – the quiet Zhang Qiling (Yang Yang), the resourceful Pang Zi (Liu Tianzuo), the experienced Wu Sanxing (Ken Chang), San Xing's loyal helper Pan Zi (Wei Wei), and the skillful Ah Ning (Tiffany Tang) – Wu Xie sets out to find the lost treasures as well as the people responsible for the massacre of his family.

Cast

Main

Supporting

Production
In June 2014, a press conference was held at Shanghai and attended by representatives of H&R Century Pictures, Beijing Enlight Media and Nanpai Investment. It was announced that a film, television series and online game would be adapted from the novel Daomu Biji by Nanpai Sanshu. In particular, the television series would be divided into 8 seasons filmed over a period of 8 years.

The series is directed by Cheang Pou-soi who directed the 2014 film The Monkey King. Other notable production crew included Hong Kong Film Award-winners Angie Lam and Bill Lui. Chun Hung Mak, who worked on the Chinese Paladin series, composed the soundtrack of the series.

Principal photography commenced in August 2014 and wrapped up on 30 November 2014 at Yamdrok Lake, Tibet. Location filming took place at the Beijing Farm Animal Research Center and the Dagao International Art Unit.

Casting
On June 24, 2014, Li Yifeng confirmed through Weibo that he would be taking on the leading role of Wu Xie. On August 31, 2014, official posters of the main cast including Li, Yang Yang, Liu Tianzuo, Ken Chang and Wei Wei were released. On November 5, 2014, Tiffany Tang was revealed to be the female lead of the series.

Deviation from novel 
In the novel, Wu Xie is the owner of an antique store but in the series, he is an overseas returnee who studied at a German University and returned to China to return an antique to the country. The rest of the team also became "protectors of the antique" instead of a "tomb-raiding team".

Two new characters, High Master and Cheng Chengcheng, were also created for the web series.

Reception
The Lost Tomb is the most watched web drama of 2015 with over 2.8 billion views.

Despite its popularity, the series was criticized for its draggy story-line and poorly done special effects. Fans of the novel also commented that the plot and characters deviated too much from the original novel.

Awards and nominations

See also
Time Raiders, a 2016 film based on the same novel series
The Mystic Nine, a 2016 prequel on the same novel series

International broadcast

References

External links
  The Lost Tomb Sina Weibo

 
2015 Chinese television series debuts
IQIYI original programming
Television series by H&R Century Pictures
Chinese web series
2015 web series debuts